Austrians Abroad are Austrian citizens, migrants and expatriates alike, who reside outside the Republic of Austria.

The interests of these approximately 500,000 Austrians living abroad, in Germany (243,000), Switzerland (50,000), USA (30,000), UK (22,000), South Africa (18,000), Australia and Spain (15,000 each) are represented by the World Federation of Austrians Abroad, a NGO with headquarters in Vienna, Austria. It is also the umbrella organisation for more than 170 Austrian clubs worldwide, publisher of the quarterly magazine ROTWEISSROT (named after the colours of the Austrian flag), and runs the online community austrians.org (founded in 2004 by Gerald Ganglbauer).

Communities
 Austrian Americans
 Austrian Argentines
 Austrian Australians
 Austrian Brazilians
 Austrian Canadians
 Austrian Mexicans
 Austrians of Croatia
 Austrians of Romania
 Austrian South African
 Austrians in the United Kingdom
 Austrian Uruguayans

Austrian Citizens Abroad in 2021 (Top 10) 
: 435,000

: 59,000

: 39,000

: 33,000

: 20,000

: 18,000

: 17,000

: 16,000

: 12,000

: 10,000

See also

 German Speaking Evangelical Congregation in Iran
 Ashkenazi Synagogue of Istanbul
 German-Speaking Jewry Heritage Museum Tefen
 Geographical distribution of German speakers

References

External links 
Austrians - Weltweit Freunde
Auslandsösterreicher-Weltbund
Austrian Ministry for European and International Affairs
Diaspora of Austrian Jews

Austrian emigrants
Austrian expatriates
Austrian diaspora
European diasporas